Haralambos "Bobby" Smyrniotis (born April 24, 1979) is a Canadian soccer coach and former player who works as head coach of Forge FC of the Canadian Premier League. Smyrniotis is the co-founder of the Sigma FC soccer academy based in Mississauga.

Playing career
Smyrniotis played for the College of Charleston and York University.

Coaching career

Early career
In 2003 and 2004, Smyrniotis was a coach in the academy system of Olympiacos. He co-founded Sigma FC, and was the team's head coach from 2005 to 2018.

Forge FC

2019 season
On October 1, 2018, Smyrniotis was announced as the first head coach and technical director of Canadian Premier League club Forge FC. During the 2019 season, Forge finished in second place during the Spring and Fall Seasons, both times behind Cavalry FC. He became the first coach to win the Canadian Premier League when Forge defeated Cavalry FC in the 2019 Canadian Premier League Finals. Also during the 2019 season, Forge were knocked out in the second qualifying round of the Canadian Championship. They also played in the CONCACAF League where they were knocked out in the Round of 16.

2020 season
Smyrniotis returned to coach Forge FC for the 2020 season. The 2020 Canadian Premier League season was played in three rounds. Forge qualified for the next round after finishing the first round in third place then qualified for the championship match after finishing in first place in the second round. Forge repeated as league champions after a 2–0 win in the Championship final against HFX Wanderers.

2021 season
In the CONCACAF League, Smyrniotis guided Forge FC to the semi-finals, qualifying the club for the CONCACAF Champions League for the first time in its history.

Coaching record

Personal life
Smyrniotis received a Specialized Honours Bachelor of Arts degree in Kinesiology & Health Science from York University and a Master of Science degree in Sports Management from the University of Louisville.

Honours

Coach
Forge FC
Canadian Premier League: 2019, 2020, 2022
Canadian Premier League regular season: 2021

References

1979 births
Living people
Canadian soccer coaches
Canadian soccer players
Soccer players from Toronto
Sportspeople from Scarborough, Toronto
Canadian people of Greek descent
Forge FC non-playing staff
College of Charleston Cougars men's soccer players
York Lions soccer players
Expatriate soccer players in the United States
Canadian expatriate soccer players
Canadian expatriate sportspeople in the United States
Olympiacos F.C. non-playing staff
Canadian expatriate sportspeople in Greece
Association football midfielders
Canadian Premier League coaches